Jane Parker may refer to:

Jane Porter (Tarzan), named Jane Parker in the film Tarzan the Ape Man
Jane Boleyn, Viscountess Rochford (c. 1505–1542), born Jane Parker, sister-in-law of Anne Boleyn
Jane E. Parker (born 1960), British botanist
Jane Parker (management academic), New Zealand management academic
Jane Parker, a former private brand of The Great Atlantic & Pacific Tea Company now made by another company